This is a list of Sicilian dishes and foods. Sicilian cuisine shows traces of all the cultures which established themselves on the island of Sicily over the last two millennia. Although its cuisine has much in common with Italian cuisine, Sicilian food also has Spanish, Greek and Arab influences.

Sicilian dishes

 Arancini or Arancine – stuffed rice balls which are coated with breadcrumbs and fried. They are said to have originated in Sicily in the 10th century during Kalbid rule.
 Cannoli – shortcrust pastry cylindrical shell filled with sweetened sheep milk ricotta.
 Caponata- cooked vegetable salad made from chopped fried eggplant and celery seasoned with sweetened vinegar, with capers in a sweet and sour sauce.
 Crocchè- mashed potato and egg covered in bread crumbs and fried.
 Farsu magru- beef or veal slices flattened and superimposed to form a large rectangle, with a layer of thin bacon slices on top. For the filling, crushed bread slices, cheese, ham, chopped onions, garlic and fresh herbs are mixed together.
 Frittula - pork and/or beef byproducts from butchering, fried in lard and spiced. 
 Likëngë – pork sausages flavored with salt, pepper and seed of Fennel (farë mbrai), made in Piana degli Albanesi and Santa Cristina Gela
 Maccu, a soup with dried fava beans and fennel.
 Muffuletta- a sesame-seed bread, or the layered New Orleans sandwich made with it, stuffed with sausage meats, cheese, olive salad, etc.
 Panelle – Sicilian fritters made from chickpea flour and other ingredients. They are a popular street food in Palermo.
 Pani ca meusa - organ meats (lung, spleen) and sausage served on Vastedda, a sesame-seed bun
 Pasta ncasciata - a baked pasta dish with many varieties but most often including maccheroni pasta, ragú, eggplant, basil, white wine, breadcrumbs, boiled eggs, soppressata or salami, caciocavallo, pecorino siciliano, and sometimes meatballs and/or peas, or other cheeses or besciamella substituted for one of the cheeses.
 Pasta alla Norma, pasta with tomatoes, fried eggplant, ricotta and basil.
 Pasta ca nunnata - a Palermo pasta dish made with a long pasta, a sauce of gianchetti (the whitebait of Mediterranean sardines and anchovies), olive oil, garlic, parsley, black pepper, and white wine.
 Pasta â Paolina - pasta with anchovies, garlic, tomato, cinnamon, cloves, almonds, fresh basil and breadcrumbs.
 Pasta con le sarde, pasta with sardines and anchovies.
 Pesto alla trapanese – a Sicilian variation of the genoese pesto, typical of the Province of Trapani. The dish was introduced in ancient times by Genoese ships, coming from the east and stopping at the port of Trapani, who brought the tradition of agliata, a sort of pesto-sauce based on garlic and walnuts.
 Pasta chi Vrocculi Arriminati - a pasta dish from Palermo which generally consists of a long pasta like spaghetti or bucatini, cauliflower, onion, raisins, anchovies, pine nuts, saffron, red chili, and breadcrumbs.
 Scaccia/Scacciata -a thin flatbread layered with vegetables, cheese and meats and rolled up.
 Sicilian pizza –  pizza prepared in a manner that originated in Sicily. In the United States, the phrase Sicilian pizza is often synonymous with thick-crust or deep-dish pizza derived from the sicilian Sfincione.
 Spaghetti alla carrettiera - A dish of spaghetti pasta, with olive oil, raw garlic, chili pepper, parsley, and pecorino siciliano or breadcrumbs, and commonly tomato.
 Stigghiola - spiced and grilled intestine, typically from lamb or goat.
 Stuffed eggplant
Orange Salad - Oranges, extra virgin olive oil, salt, spring onions. 
Couscous trapanese - typical of the Trapani area, with vegetables, meat, or fish.

Beverages
 Amaro Averna, a herb-citrus liqueur.
 Marsala wine
 Zibibbo

Sodas
 Sibat Tomarchio
 Bibite Polara

Cheeses
 Caciocavallo and Ragusano cheese, stretched-curd cheeses similar to Mozzarella.
 Canestrato, a hard cheese made from a mixture of sheep and goat milks.
 Ricotta, a fresh cheese made from whey.
 Pecorino Siciliano - a Sicilian sheep's-milk cheese.

Desserts and sweets

 Biscotti Regina
 Buccellato
 Cannoli
 Cassata
 Ciarduna
 Cioccolato di Modica
 Crocetta of Caltanissetta
 Cuccìa
 Cuccidati
 Frutta martorana
 Gelato
 Gelo di melone
 Giurgiulena
 Granita
 Ice cream
 'Mpanatigghi
 'Nzuddi
 Pignolata
 Pignolo (macaroon)
 Raffiolini
 Zeppole

Fruits and vegetables
 Aglio Rosso di Nubia
 Cipolla di Giarratana
 Mazzarrone (grape)
 Pomodoro di Pachino
 Siracusa lemon

Salads

 Caponata – a Sicilian aubergine (eggplant) dish consisting of a cooked vegetable salad made from chopped fried eggplant and celery seasoned with sweetened vinegar, with capers in a sweet and sour sauce.
 Sicilian orange salad – (Insalata di arance) is a typical salad dish of Sicilian and Spanish cuisine which uses oranges as its main ingredient. It is usually served at the beginning or at the end of a meal.
 Pantelleria salad - (Insalata pantesca) is a salad consisting of tomatoes, boiled potatoes, red onions and mackerel (or fresh cheese) and seasoned with olive oil, oregano, salt and capers.

See also

 Italian cuisine
 List of Italian dishes

References

External links

Lists of foods by nationality
Italian cuisine-related lists